Lasha Dvali (born 14 May 1995) is a Georgian professional footballer who plays as a centre-back for Cypriot First Division club APOEL and the Georgia national team.

Club career
In June 2013, Dvali moved to Latvian Higher League side FC Skonto, before moving again three months later to English Championship side Reading. Reading loaned Dvali back to Skonto in February 2014, for the 2014 season, before he was again loaned out in February 2015, this time to Süper Lig side Kasımpaşa for the remainder of the 2014–15 season.

On 31 August 2015, Dvali signed a one-year contract, with the option of a second, with German 2. Bundesliga side MSV Duisburg. The contract was voided on 21 December 2015. He joined Śląsk Wrocław on 13 January 2016.

On 3 March 2017, he was loaned to Irtysh Pavlodar, with the deal expiring on 11 June 2017.

On 24 July 2017, he moved to Pogoń Szczecin.

Ferencváros
On 30 January 2019, Dvali transferred to Ferencváros.

On 16 June 2020, he became champion with Ferencváros by beating Budapest Honvéd FC at the Hidegkuti Nándor Stadion on the 30th match day of the 2019–20 Nemzeti Bajnokság I season.

On 20 April 2021, he won the 2020-21 Nemzeti Bajnokság I season with Ferencváros by beating archrival Újpest FC 3-0 at the Groupama Arena. The goals were scored by Myrto Uzuni (3rd and 77th minute) and Tokmac Nguen (30th minute).

International career
Dvali was called up for the Georgian national team in October 2014 for the game against Gibraltar, having previously missed out on the squad to face Scotland due to visa problems in travelling to Scotland.

He made his debut on 29 March 2015 in a European qualifier against reigning World Cup champions Germany, replacing the injured Aleksandre Amisulashvili after four minutes in a 0–2 defeat at the Boris Paichadze Dinamo Arena in his native Tbilisi.

Career statistics

Club

International goals
Scores and results list Georgia's goal tally first.

Honours
Ferencvárosi 
 Nemzeti Bajnokság I: (3) 2019–20, 2020–21, 2021–22
 Magyar Kupa: 2021–22

References

External links
UEFA U-17 Profile
UEFA U-19 Profile
UEFA U-21 Profile

Kasımpaşa Profile

1995 births
Living people
Footballers from Tbilisi
Footballers from Georgia (country)
Georgia (country) international footballers
Georgia (country) under-21 international footballers
Association football defenders
Expatriate footballers from Georgia (country)
Skonto FC players
Reading F.C. players
Kasımpaşa S.K. footballers
MSV Duisburg players
Śląsk Wrocław players
FC Irtysh Pavlodar players
Pogoń Szczecin players
Ferencvárosi TC footballers
Ekstraklasa players
Kazakhstan Premier League players
Süper Lig players
2. Bundesliga players
Nemzeti Bajnokság I players
Expatriate footballers in Latvia
Expatriate footballers in England
Expatriate footballers in Turkey
Expatriate footballers in Poland
Expatriate footballers in Kazakhstan
Expatriate footballers in Hungary
Expatriate sportspeople from Georgia (country) in Latvia
Expatriate sportspeople from Georgia (country) in England
Expatriate sportspeople from Georgia (country) in Turkey
Expatriate sportspeople from Georgia (country) in Poland
Expatriate sportspeople from Georgia (country) in Kazakhstan
Expatriate sportspeople from Georgia (country) in Hungary